Bironkhal Tehsil is a administrative division located in the Pauri Garhwal district of the Indian state of Uttarakhand.It is one of the 14 tehsils in the district and is headquartered in the town of Syunsi. It was created in 2016 with 367 villages taken from Dhumakot, Chaubattakhal and Thalisain tehsils. The main languages spoken in the area are Hindi and Garhwali.

The main economic activities in the region include agriculture, forestry, and tourism. The area is known for its rich natural beauty, with several forests and wildlife sanctuaries located nearby. This region is on the border of Kumaun and near the Dudhatoli range. This was the area of operations of the famous lady warrior Tilu Rauteli or Garhwal. 

The tehsil is served by several schools, a polytechnic, as well as a Community Health Center. There are also several religious and cultural landmarks located in the region, including temples and shrines.

References

Cities and towns in Pauri Garhwal district
Tehsils of India
Pauri Garhwal district